Ross Doohan (born 29 March 1998) is a Scottish professional footballer who plays as a goalkeeper for Forest Green Rovers.

Club career

Celtic
Doohan began his career with Celtic, spending time on loan with Cumbernauld Colts in October 2015, where he made 4 appearances in all competitions. He moved on loan to Greenock Morton in August 2017, returning to Celtic in January 2018, having failed to make any senior appearances whilst at Greenock.

After signing a new four-year contract with Celtic, he moved on loan to Ayr United in July 2018, making his senior debut on 14 July 2018 in a Scottish League Cup game against former club Greenock Morton. Having played for Ayr for the whole of the 2018–19 season, Doohan rejoined Ayr on loan for a second spell in July 2019.

In July 2020 he was linked with a third spell at Ayr. On 1 August 2020 he signed for Ross County on a season-long loan. With Ross Laidlaw largely preferred in goal, he made only five appearances for Ross County and returned to Celtic in January 2021. He then joined Dundee United on an emergency loan in April 2021 following an injury to their first choice goalkeeper, Benjamin Siegrist.

Tranmere Rovers
In August 2021 he moved on loan to Tranmere Rovers. The transfer became permanent in July 2022.

Forest Green Rovers
He transferred to Forest Green Rovers in January 2023.

International career
Doohan represented Scotland at various youth international levels.

Selected for the Scotland under-20 squad in the 2017 Toulon Tournament, he played in the third place play-off match, as Scotland won the bronze medal. It was the nations first ever medal at the competition. Selected for the under-21 squad in the 2018 Toulon Tournament, he played as the team lost to Turkey in a penalty shoot-out for third-place.

Career statistics

References

1998 births
Living people
Scottish footballers
Celtic F.C. players
Cumbernauld Colts F.C. players
Greenock Morton F.C. players
Ayr United F.C. players
Ross County F.C. players
Scottish Professional Football League players
Lowland Football League players
Association football goalkeepers
Scotland youth international footballers
Scotland under-21 international footballers
Dundee United F.C. players
Tranmere Rovers F.C. players
Forest Green Rovers F.C. players
English Football League players